ISTAF may refer to:

 ISTAF Berlin, an international athletics meet in Berlin
 International Sepaktakraw Federation, the organization that sanctions international competition in sepak takraw